Xilmilli (also, Khil’mili, Khil’milli, and Khilmih) is a village and municipality in the Gobustan Rayon of Azerbaijan.  It has a population of 1,743.  The municipality consists of the villages of Xilmilli and Şıxlar.

References 

Populated places in Gobustan District